Ivoechiton is an extinct genus of polyplacophoran molluscs. Ivoechiton became extinct during the Cretaceous period.

References 

Prehistoric chiton genera
Ordovician first appearances
Cretaceous extinctions